The Civil Order of Alfonso XII is a Spanish honorific decoration named for King Alfonso XII (1857–1885). It was established by Royal Decree on 23 May 1902 to reward achievements in education, science, culture, teaching and research.

History
According to Article 3 of the Royal Decree, the order is composed of three categories: Grand Cross, Commander, and Chevalier.

Beginning in 1939, the members of the Order could request their entry into the newly created Civil Order of Alfonso X, the Wise.

Royal Decree 954/1988, of 2 September, finalized its replacement with the Civil Order of Alfonso X, the Wise, "adapting its norms to the social conditions of the present time and to the democratic principles on which the legal system is based."

Selected recipients

See also
 Orders, decorations, and medals of Spain

References

External links

 World Awards

Orders, decorations, and medals of Spain
1902 establishments in Spain
1988 disestablishments in Spain
Awards established in 1902
Awards disestablished in 1988